Erika Ritter (born 26 April 1948) is a Canadian playwright and humorist.

Born in Regina, Saskatchewan, she attended Sacred Heart Academy for High School, studied drama at McGill University and the University of Toronto. In addition to her published work, she has written and hosted programming for CBC Radio. Ritter was host of Saturday Stereo Theatre (1983–1984), Dayshift (1985–88), Air Craft (1988–1990) and Ontario Morning (2000–2005). She has also served as guest host on numerous programs, including As It Happens, The Sunday Edition, The Arts Tonight, Here and Now and Fresh Air, all on CBC Radio One.

Two of her plays, The Passing Scene and Murder at McQueen, have been produced at Toronto's Tarragon Theatre.

Bibliography
 Automatic Pilot (1980)
 The Passing Scene (1981)
 Urban Scrawl (1984)
 Murder at McQueen (1986)
 Ritter in Residence (1987)
 The Hidden Life of Humans (1997)
 The Great Big Book of Guys (2004)
 The Dog by the Cradle, the Serpent Beneath: Some Paradoxes of Human-Animal Relationships (2009)

References

External links
 
Erika Ritter's official site

Canadian women dramatists and playwrights
Canadian humorists
Canadian people of German descent
1948 births
Living people
Writers from Regina, Saskatchewan
CBC Radio hosts
20th-century Canadian dramatists and playwrights
21st-century Canadian dramatists and playwrights
20th-century Canadian women writers
21st-century Canadian women writers
Women humorists
Canadian women radio hosts